Marquesia is a genus of plant in family Dipterocarpaceae. It is native to Africa and can be found in Angola, Equatorial Guinea, Gabon, Tanzania, Zambia, Zaïre and Zimbabwe.

It contains the following species:
 Marquesia acuminata 
 Marquesia excelsa 
 Marquesia macroura 

The genus name of Marquesia is in honour of L. Marques, who was a Portuguese plant collector hunting in Angola and Mozambique.

The genus was circumscribed by Ernst Friedrich Gilg in Bot. Jahrb. Syst. vol.40 on page 485 in 1908.

References

Dipterocarpaceae
Malvales genera
Flora of South Tropical Africa
Flora of Equatorial Guinea
Flora of Gabon
Plants described in 1908